Sulima may refer to:

Sulima, Sierra Leone, a city in West Africa
Sulima Chiefdom, a Sierra Leone Chiefdom
Sulima coat of arms, used in Poland
Sulima (surname)
Sulima (simulator): a full-system MIPS simulator

See also